Rishi is a 2005 Indian Kannada-language romance film directed and written by Prakash. The film stars Shiva Rajkumar, Vijay Raghavendra, Radhika and Sindhu Tolani in the lead roles along with Srinath and Avinash in other prominent roles. The score and soundtrack was by Gurukiran whose compositions were appreciated by critics and masses. The film ran for a hundred days and eventually went on to become one of the hits of the year 2005. The film was remade in Telugu as Bangaru Babu (2009) with Jagapathi Babu.

Plot

Cast

Shiva Rajkumar as Rishi
Vijay Raghavendra as Hari
Radhika as Spoorthi
Sindhu Tolani as Sneha
Srinath
Doddanna
Vinaya Prasad
Ramakrishna
Sumithra
Avinash
Satyajith
Bhanu Prakash 
Sridhar Raj 
Yamuna Murthy 
Rekha. V. Kumar 
Sindhu Chethan 
Badri Narayan 
John 
K. D. Venkatesh 
Anand Rao 
Niranjan Shetty 
Hari Das G. 
Ashok Rao 
Mandeep Rai 
Kishori Ballal
Vijay
Karthik Sharma

Soundtrack

Awards
 2004–05 Karnataka State Film Awards
 Best Screenplay - Prakash, Abhishek
 Best Sound Recording - Murali

References

External links
Movie review
Movie review

2005 films
2000s Kannada-language films
2005 romantic drama films
Films set in Bangalore
Indian romantic drama films
Films scored by Gurukiran
Kannada films remade in other languages
Films shot in Bangalore